Step Brothers has been an American hip hop supergroup and record production team, formed in 2008, from Los Angeles. Named after the 2008 film of the same name, the duo is composed of The Alchemist and Evidence, who produce and rap, respectively. Although the two have had multiple collaborations prior to their official formation as a duo, the group's first credited song was "So Fresh" on Evidence's 2008 EP The Layover, with their official debut album, Lord Steppington, being released in 2014.

Discography

Studio albums

Singles

Guest appearances

References

Hip hop groups from California
Record production duos
Rhymesayers Entertainment artists
Musical groups established in 2014
Hip hop duos
American musical duos
2014 establishments in California
Hip hop supergroups